Phyllospadix japonicus, known as Asian surfgrass, is a plant species found along the seacoasts of Japan, Korea, China (Hebei, Liaoning, Shandong). It occurs in the intertidal zone along the shore.

Phyllospadix japonicus  is a perennial herb spreading by means of rhizomes. Leaves are long, up to 100 cm long but rarely more than 2.5 mm across.

References

japonicus
Salt marsh plants
Flora of Hebei
Flora of Liaoning
Flora of Shandong
Flora of Japan
Flora of Korea
Flora of China
Biota of the Pacific Ocean
Plants described in 1897